The 2014 European Short Track Speed Skating Championships took place between 17 and 19 January 2014 in Dresden, Germany.

Medal summary

Medal table

Men's events

Women's events

Participating nations

See also
 Short track speed skating
 European Short Track Speed Skating Championships

References

External links
 Detailed results
 Results overview

European Short Track Speed Skating Championships
European Short Track Speed Skating Championships
European
European Short Track Speed Skating Championships
International speed skating competitions hosted by Germany
Sport in Dresden